The 2022–23 Auburn Tigers men's basketball team represented Auburn University during the 2022–23 NCAA Division I men's basketball season as a member of the Southeastern Conference. The team's head coach was Bruce Pearl in his ninth season at Auburn.  The team played their home games at Neville Arena in Auburn, Alabama.

Previous season
The 2021–22 Auburn Tigers men's basketball team finished the 2021–22 season 28–6, 15–3 in SEC play to finish as regular season champions. As the No. 1 seed, they were defeated by No. 8 seed Texas A&M in the quarterfinals. They received an at-large bid to the NCAA tournament as the No. 2 seed in the Midwest Region, where they defeated Jacksonville State in the First Round before being upset by Miami in the Second Round.

On January 24, 2022, the team was voted first in the AP poll for the first time in program history, in the midst of a nineteen game winning streak.

Offseason

Departures

Incoming transfers

2022 recruiting class

2023 recruiting class

Roster

Schedule

|-
!colspan=9 style=""|Exhibition

|-
!colspan=9 style=""|Regular season

|-
!colspan=9 style=""| SEC Tournament

|-
!colspan=9 style=""| NCAA Tournament

Statistics

Team Highs

Individual Highs

Rankings

See also
2022–23 Auburn Tigers women's basketball team

References

Auburn
Auburn Tigers men's basketball seasons
Auburn Tigers men's basketball
Auburn Tigers men's basketball
Auburn